The Poás Volcano,, is an active  stratovolcano in central Costa Rica and is located within Poas Volcano National Park. It has erupted 40 times since 1828, including April 2017 when visitors and residents were evacuated. The volcano and surrounding park were closed for nearly 17 months, with a 2.5 kilometer safety perimeter established around the erupting crater. As of September 1, 2018 the park has reopened with limited access only to the crater observation area and requires a reservation to be made on the National Park Website.  Adjacent trails to Lake Botos as well as the museum at the visitor center remained closed. The volcano erupted briefly twice in September 2019.

Crater lakes 
There are two crater lakes near the summit. The northern lake is known as the Laguna Caliente ("hot lagoon") and is located at a height of 2,300 m in a crater approximately 0.3 km wide and 30 m deep. It is one of the world's most acidic lakes. The acidity varies after rain and changes in volcanic activity, sometimes reaching a pH of almost 0. The bottom of this lake is covered with a layer of liquid sulfur. Acidity, lake temperature fluctuations, and a complex, toxic sulfur and iron chemistry (conjectured to be like conditions on early Earth and Mars) limits aquatic life to specially-adapted Acidiphilium bacteria. Above ground, acid gases create acid rain and acid fog, causing damage to surrounding ecosystems and often irritation of eyes and lungs.

Lake Botos, the southern lake, fills an inactive crater, which last erupted in 7500 BC. It is cold and clear, and is surrounded by a cloud forest within the National Park boundaries.

Eruptive history 

On May 17, 1953, an eruption occurred that started a cycle that lasted until 1956. At least two people were reported missing.

Poás was near the epicenter of a 6.1-magnitude earthquake in January 2009 that killed at least forty people and affected Fraijanes, Vara Blanca, Cinchona (the most affected area), the capital San José, and the Central Valley region of Costa Rica.

There was also eruptive activity in 2009 involving minor phreatic eruptions and landslides within the northern active crater.  Poás eruptions often include geyser-like ejections of crater-lake water.

On February 25, 2014, a webcam from the Volcanological and Seismological Observatory of Costa Rica (OVSICORI) captured the moment a dark cloud exploded about 1,000 feet in the air from a massive crater of the Poás Volcano.  This volcano remains active today.
Poás is one of 9 volcanoes currently monitored by the Deep Earth Carbon Degassing Project. The project is collecting data on the carbon dioxide and sulfur dioxide emission rates from subaerial volcanoes.

2017 Activity 

On April 9, 2017, National Park officials placed restrictions on visitors at Poas due to an increased volume of toxic gases at the summit crater. An explosion on April 12 caused park officials to close the popular park to visitors. The measure was termed "temporary." Some nearby residents were also evacuated.

On April 14, 2017, two eruptions at 07:39 and 07:57 created an over three kilometer ash and vapor column. Further explosions occurred April 16.

Following a substantial  blast on April 22 that sent incandescent rocks over a large area which damaged park buildings and infrastructure, Costa Rica President Luis Guillermo Solis toured the surrounding towns the following two days. Business owners described the negative financial impacts the volcano park closure were causing, and Solis released a video in Spanish and English urging potential tourists to visit the nearby community shops and restaurants. He also promised emergency agencies would continue to make updated reports on the eruption.  As of September 1, 2018, the National Park has re-opened with limited access and revised regulations.  Visitors are required to make an online reservation to enter the park and the number of visitors and time allowed at the crater is limited. Only the main crater observation area is open as of September 2018.  Adjacent trails including the trail to the Lake Botos remain closed.

2019 Activity 
 February 11, 2019: According to the Volcanological and Seismological Observatory of Costa Rica (OVSICORI), the eruption began at 1:50 a.m. Monday and sent a column of ash 200 meters above the crater.
 September 30, 2019, 05:41: Eruption of ash and solid material, with a 2 kilometer column, in contrast of previous water vapor activities on September 23, 2019.

IUGS geological heritage site
In respect of it being 'an iconic and type example of an arc shield-like massive stratovolcano and type example of an active crater lake complex', the International Union of Geological Sciences (IUGS) included 'The Poás volcano' in its assemblage of 100 'geological heritage sites' around the world in a listing published in October 2022. The organisation defines an IUGS Geological Heritage Site as 'a key place with geological elements and/or processes of international scientific relevance, used as a reference, and/or with a substantial contribution to the development of geological sciences through history.'

See also 
 List of volcanoes in Costa Rica
 Ark Herb Farm

References 

 Volcano World: Poas, Costa Rica

External links 
 bathymetric survey of Laguna Caliente with a drone boat

Stratovolcanoes of Costa Rica
Active volcanoes
Volcanic crater lakes
Geography of Alajuela Province
Mountains of Costa Rica
First 100 IUGS Geological Heritage Sites